Football Club Utrecht is a Dutch professional football club based in Utrecht. The club competes in the Eredivisie, the top tier of Dutch football, and plays its home matches at the Stadion Galgenwaard.

The club was formed in 1970 as a merger between local clubs VV DOS, USV Elinkwijk and Velox. Since then, the club has won three national cup tournaments: in 1985, 2003 and 2004, also winning the Johan Cruyff Shield in 2004 as the first club outside the traditional Dutch Big Three. Utrecht is also the only club outside the Big Three which has never suffered relegation from the top-flight Eredivisie.

Utrecht have competed in 15 European campaigns, reaching the group stages of the 2004–05 UEFA Cup and the 2010–11 UEFA Europa League, their best European results.

History

1970–1979: Merger and early years
In the late 1960s, the municipality of Utrecht initiated talks of a merger between the professional departments of VV DOS, Velox and USV Elinkwijk with the aim of continuing to guarantee professional football at top level in the city. DOS was the largest of the three clubs, and had won a national championship in 1958. With stout defensive tactics, the club had narrowly escaped relegation for three successive years, and mismanagement had left the club on the brink of bankruptcy. A cynical comment from that time was: "The club can do nothing, not even relegate."

Merger plans were experienced less positively at Velox and Elinkwijk. Velox had been promoted to the Eerste Divisie in the early 1960s and had been close to achieving promotion to the Eredivisie a few times. In 1968, however, the team relegated to the third-tier Tweede Divisie again. Elinkwijk had been more successful than Velox. A yo-yo club, Elinkwijk alternated seasons in the bottom of the Eredivisie with seasons in the top of the Eerste Divisie. In addition, there was a sentiment in Elinkwijk that it was not originally an Utrecht-based club, but that it belonged more to the town of Zuilen which was an independent municipality until 1954. The club had no preference for the impending merger, but eventually gave in to pressure from the municipality. During the merger talks, Elinkwijk tried to secure a spot in the highest league of amateur football, but was instead placed in the Tweede Klasse. The following season, the club won the championship and as a result promoted to the Eerste Klasse.

On 1 July 1970, the merger became a fact and FC Utrecht was founded. Since VV DOS had managed to avoid relegation from the Eredivisie in the season before, the new club could immediately play at the highest level in its inaugural season. FC Utrechts's home ground became Stadion Galgenwaard, which had previously been the VV DOS home ground, the largest stadium of the three parent clubs. The first manager of Utrecht became Bert Jacobs, the then 29-year-old head coach of Velox, who was joined by 24-year-old Fritz Korbach from USV Elinkwijk as assistant. Their assignment was to forge one club with one culture from its three cores and three different identities.

In the first season, the FC Utrecht first-team squad consisted almost entirely of former players from DOS, Velox and USV Elinkwijk. Only one outside player was recruited, as defender Co Adriaanse was signed for ƒ 125,000 from De Volewijckers from Amsterdam. The core of the squad also consisted of former DOS players Cor Hildebrand, Ed van Stijn, Piet van Oudenallen, Tom Nieuwenhuys and John Steen Olsen, former Elinkwijk players Joop Leliveld, Jan Blaauw, Dick Teunissen and Jan Groenendijk and former Velox player Marco Cabo. Their first official match was against defending European Cup winners Feyenoord. Groenendijk scored Utrecht's first goal, but despite the 0–1 lead, the team eventually lost 4–1. The club finished in 9th place in its inaugural season, a solid midtable finish.

1980–1990: Near bankruptcy and revival
In the first ten years of its existence, FC Utrecht grew steadily. Important players from that period were Hans van Breukelen, Leo van Veen and Willem van Hanegem. In the early 1980s, it was decided to construct a new stadium, which was called Nieuw Galgenwaard.

The tide turned in 1981 when the Dutch Fiscal Information and Investigation Service (FIOD) opened an investigation into the club. They could reveal a series of financial malpractices, including transfer and salary costs of various players being financed illegally. Between 1976 and 1980, the club had not paid national insurance contributions and taxes on signing bonuses. In addition, there had been committed fraud with receipts. The club could not meet the stated additional tax and was placed under a debt moratorium. Bankruptcy, at that point, seemed inevitable. Various campaigns were organised by players and supporters, and through a petition, the club managed to collect 66,000 signatures for the retention of the club. Under the leadership of goalkeeper Hans van Breukelen, first-team players went canvassing with FC Utrecht merchandise and recorded a single entitled "We geven het niet op" ("We don't give up"). The municipality of Utrecht eventually decided to respond to the massive local support and covered expenses.

The early 1980s, under the leadership of head coach and former player Han Berger, were successful. The team finished in 5th place in 1980, 3rd in 1981 and 5th place in 1982 of the Eredivisie and in 1982 the club also reached the KNVB Cup final, which was lost to AZ '67. The team also played European football for the first time in club history. The success was in large part due to the large number of youth players that broke through to the first team during these years. Out of eighteen first-team players reaching the cup final in 1982, fourteen were academy players, including van Breukelen, Gert Kruys, Willy Carbo and Ton de Kruijk. Many of these players, such as Leo van Veen, Frans Adelaar, Willem van Hanegem, Ton du Chatinier and Jan Wouters, would later return to the club as managers.

Although the club went through a golden era results-wise, the club was far from healthy financially. To keep the club afloat, key players were let go every season. Van Breukelen left for Nottingham Forest in 1982, Carbo for Club Brugge in 1983 and Rob de Wit for Ajax in 1983. As a result, FC Utrecht dropped from a near-top side to more mid-table finishes in the Eredivisie table in the mid-1980s.

On 1 April 1985, Utrechts Nieuwsblad published an article about an imminent takeover of the club. A consortium of, among others, the English newspaper magnate Robert Maxwell, Philips, KLM and Johan Cruyff, were said to have plans to invest heavily in FC Utrecht and acquire a majority shareholding. The supporters of the club were strongly against the takeover, however, especially due to the interference of Ajax legend, Cruyff. Ultimately, the takeover failed.

1991–2005: Troubled 1990s, success and tragedy

After a number of weaker years, FC Utrecht reached 4th place in the Eredivisie in 1990–91, led by manager Ab Fafié and with players such as Johan de Kock, Jan Willem van Ede and Rob Alflen and top goalscorer of the season, Włodzimierz Smolarek. After this, however, things went downhill for the club. Because Utrecht missed out on European qualification, incomes were lost. Between 1989 and 1996, six managers led the team and there were just as many changes in the board of directors. Quarrels and financial issues arose, which again meant that key players had to be sold to close the holes in the budget. Alflen left for Ajax in 1991, de Kock left for Roda JC in 1994 and Ferdi Vierklau moved to Vitesse in 1996.

Main sponsor AMEV intervened in the dire financial situation in 1996. The club received a financial injection in exchange for a substantial shareholder position. The insurance company appointed Hans Herremans as club chairman. Many investments were made immediately in 1996, as Errol Refos, Rob Witschge and former Utrecht player John van Loen came over from Feyenoord, Reinier Robbemond from FC Dordrecht, Dick van Burik from NAC and Michael Mols from FC Twente. Ronald Spelbos was appointed manager with Jan Wouters as assistant. In 1998, a complete renovation of the Stadion Galgenwaard was initiated, designed by ZJA Zwarts & Jansma Architecten.

Despite the capital injection, successes on the pitch failed to materialise during the first years, and a number of managers were hired and fired in rapid succession. In 1993, the team reached a relatively successful 8th place, but for the next eight years, until 2001, the club was unable climb to a higher position than 10th place in the table. In 1994 and 1996, the club even finished 15th, just above the relegation spots. In 1996, the team won only six matches, including an important 1–2 win at FC Twente, which meant that the promotion/relegation play-offs were avoided. Only in 2001, Utrecht managed to achieve European qualification again with a 5th-place finish, led by former player Frans Adelaar, who had become manager. Utrecht finished with the same number of points as RKC Waalwijk, Roda JC and Vitesse, but secured 5th place on goal difference. In 2002, the team lost the final of the KNVB Cup to Ajax, but in 2003 and 2004, the team, which had come under the leadership of Foeke Booy, managed to win the cup. Important players in this period included Dirk Kuyt, Tom Van Mol, Jean-Paul de Jong, Pascal Bosschaart and Stijn Vreven. In 2004, the Johan Cruyff Shield was also won at the expense of Ajax (2–4), as Hans Somers claimed a key role with two crucial goals.

As a result of, among other things, a new financial crisis and a lack of lucrative transfers, Utrecht was again on the brink of collapse in the spring of 2003. There was no more money to pay Midreth, the company responsible for constructing the renovation of the stadium. At that time, the stadium was largely finished. Since the material for the construction had already been delivered, the construction company advanced the costs, about € 5.5 million. However, this once again left the club with a substantial debt. Bankruptcy was averted with a remediation and the sale of all properties, including the stadium, to, among others, the municipality of Utrecht and Midreth. In the following years, FC Utrecht returned to the mid-table of the Eredivisie.

On 29 November 2005, French defender and fan favourite, David Di Tommaso died suddenly at the age of 26. Di Tommaso had suffered a cardiac arrest in his sleep. The club subsequently retired Di Tommaso's kit number, 4. At the end of each season, the David Di Tommaso Trophy is awarded to the player who was considered of the most valuable that season by fans; the winner is determined by an internet poll. Before his death, Di Tommaso had been the most recent winner of the FC Utrecht Player of the Year, and the award was named after him since then.

2005–2008: Phanos takeover

After the averted bankruptcy of 2003, FC Utrecht, despite participating in the UEFA Cup in 2003 and 2004, was no longer able to get out of debt. In July 2007, real estate company Phanos first showed interest in taking over the club. For the symbolic amount of €1, Phanos wanted to take over the club, including all outstanding debts. The company then intended to demolish the existing stadium to make the site available for housing. The company would then build a new stadium near the new Leidsche Rijn district. Phanos also wanted the club to become a serious contender in the Eredivisie by means of financial injections. The plan was met with a lot of resistance from supporters, as the Stadion Galgenwaard had seen a radical renovation recently.

Subsequently, a conflict broke out between chairman Jan Willem van Dop, who had come over as director of Feyenoord in 2005, and the supervisory board. The board accused Van Dop of financial mismanagement, poor communication and egotistical behavior, including the recruitment of manager Willem van Hanegem and striker Kevin Vandenbergh. On 3 September 2007, van Dop was relieved from his duties as chairman, but was put back in office three days later after summary proceedings. As a result, the entire supervisory board decided to step down.

2008–present: Van Seumeren era
On 2 April 2008, the FC Utrecht board announced in a press conference that the club had found a suitable takeover candidate in entrepreneur Frans van Seumeren, former director of the Mammoet logistics company. Van Seumeren acquired 63% of the shares of FC Utrecht bv for €16 million. He promised to commit to the club for a period of at least 10 years and to reinvest any proceeds in the club. He set the goal that the club had to reconnect with the subtop of the league table within a few years, comparable to a club like SC Heerenveen. Van Seumeren took place in the new supervisory board, of which Jacques van Ek became chairman. Despite the fact that previous takeover candidate Phanos had failed to comply with the agreement between FC Utrecht and van Seumeren, they remained affiliated with the club as main shirt sponsor until March 2011.

In his role as new owner of the club, van Seumeren was actively involved in the club's footballing policy. In the summer of 2008, against the wishes of head coach van Hanegem, he meddled with the composition of the technical staff by replacing assistant coaches John van Loen and David Nascimento, strength and conditioning coach Rob Druppers and goalkeeping coach Maarten Arts. At the end of 2008, he fired van Hanegem, after he had repeatedly expressed negative opinion on van Seumeren. Technical director Piet Buter also left afterwards. They were replaced by the duo Ton du Chatinier and Foeke Booy as head coach and technical advisor, respectively.

In 2011, chairman van Dop left FC Utrecht. In the same year, Wilco van Schaik was appointed as new director of the club. The change of function endorsed the conversion of FC Utrecht from a football association to a vennootschap (private limited company). In the summer of 2011, Du Chatinier was sacked and replaced by assistant Jan Wouters. Despite having a successful resume in terms of player sales and signings, Booy was also let go in 2012 after disappointing results on the pitch. In the 2012–13 season, Utrecht would go on to have one its best seasons historical seasons, finishing 5th in the league table, winning the play-offs for European football and equaling the club points record from 1981 (63 points). The following season, however, turned out to be a setback; Utrecht was eliminated in the second qualifying round of the UEFA Europa League by FC Differdange 03 from Luxembourg. Utrecht eventually finished 10th in the league.

When Wouters decided not to renew his contract in 2014, after having been head coach for three years, a new direction was taken in terms of technical policy. Co Adriaanse was appointed as technical advisor, a position that has been vacant since Booy's departure in 2012. Adriaanse obtained an advisory, but not binding, voice in player policy, and was given powers in composing the club's coaching staff. Rob Alflen, assistant under Wouters, would provide the training sessions. The pair were hired with the purpose of making Utrecht play more attacking, attractive football.

Alflen disappointed, only leading Utrecht to 11th place in the league table, and he was let go after only one season in charge in 2015. Erik ten Hag was appointed as his replacement, coming from a position as Bayern Munich II manager. Club icon Jean-Paul de Jong was appointed as his assistant. Adriaanse also left the club, with Ten Hag taking the extra role as technical manager. The 2015–16 season proved to be highly successful, with Utrecht ending in 5th place of the Eredivisie table and reaching the KNVB Cup final, which was lost 2–1 to Feyenoord. Utrecht would also lose the final of the play-offs for European football to Heracles Almelo. The reserves team of the club, Jong FC Utrecht, however, became champions of the Beloften Eredivisie in the 2015–16 season. With changes made to the Dutch football league system, Jong Utrecht was therefore promoted to the second-tier Eerste Divisie.

In the 2016–17 season, FC Utrecht secured a fourth-place finish with two match-days left to play. In the final of the play-offs for European football, they beat AZ Alkmaar was after an exciting diptych (0–3, 3–0, 4–3 after penalty shoot-out). As a result of Utrecht's success, Ten Hag was appointed new head coach of Ajax with assistant De Jong taking over as head coach on 1 January 2018.

Stadium

FC Utrecht's stadium is the Stadion Galgenwaard, previously named the Galgenwaard, then later the Nieuw Galgenwaard. It has a current capacity of 23,750 spectators. The attendance on average was 19,600 people in 2004–05, while the average attendance rose to 20,004 in 2006–07. The stadium also accommodates several shops, offices, and the supporters home of the FC Utrecht fan club (Supporters Vereniging F.C. Utrecht).

Honours

National
 National champions (highest level of Dutch football)
Winners: 1957–58 (as VV DOS)
 Runners-up: 1953–54 (as VV DOS)
 District champions (highest level of Dutch football before 1956–57)
Winners: 1953–54 (as VV DOS), 1955–56 (as USV Elinkwijk)
 Eerste divisie (second highest level of Dutch football)
 Runners-up: 1964–65 (as USV Elinkwijk)
 Tweede Divisie (third highest level of Dutch football)
Winners: 1961–62 (as Velox)
 Runners-up: 1969–70 (as Velox, joint with FC Wageningen but deciding match was never played because of the merger)
 KNVB Cup
 Winners: 1984–85, 2002–03, 2003–04
 Runners-up: 1981–82, 2001–02, 2015–16
 Other: 2019–20 (final was cancelled due to the COVID-19 pandemic)
 Johan Cruijff Schaal
 Winners: 2004
 Runners-up: 2003

European
 Intertoto Cup/Summer Cup
 Joint Winners: 1978

FC Utrecht in European Competition

FC Utrecht's first competitive European match, in the team's current iteration (not as DOS), was on 17 September 1980, in the 1980–81 UEFA Cup, playing FC Argeş Piteşti to a 0–0 draw. Since then, the club has participated in fourteen UEFA competitions, advancing as far as the Group Stage in the 2004–05 UEFA Cup and the 2010–11 UEFA Europa League

Accurate as of 1 August 2019

Source: UEFA.comPld = Matches played; W = Matches won; D = Matches drawn; L = Matches lost; GF = Goals for; GA = Goals against; GD = Goal Difference. Defunct competitions indicated in italics.

UEFA Current ranking

Domestic results
Below is a table with FC Utrecht's results since the introduction of the Eredivisie in 1956.

Current squad

On loan

Retired numbers

Records

Players in bold text are still active.

Staff

Current staff

Head coaches 

 Bert Jacobs (1 July 1970 – 30 June 1974)
 Jan Rab (1974–76)
 Han Berger (1 Jan 1976 – 30 June 1983)
 Barry Hughes (1983–84)
 Nol de Ruiter (1 July 1984 – 30 June 1987)
 Han Berger (1 July 1987 – 30 June 1989)
 Cees Loffeld (1989–90)
 Ab Fafié (17 Oct 1990 – 17 Feb 1993)
 Henk Vonk (caretaker) (17 Feb 1993 – Sept 16, 1993)
 Leo van Veen (Sept 17, 1993–30 June 1995)
 Ton du Chatinier and  Henk Vonk (1995)
 Simon Kistemaker (1 July 1995 – 30 Nov 1995)
 Nol de Ruiter (caretaker) (30 Nov 1995 – 23 Jan 1996)
 Ronald Spelbos (18 Jan 1996 – 27 Nov 1997)
 Jan Wouters (1997)
 Mark Wotte (31 Dec 1997 – 28 March 2000)
 Frans Adelaar (29 March 2000 – 30 June 2002)
 Foeke Booy (1 July 2002 – 30 June 2007)
 Willem van Hanegem (1 July 2007 – 23 Dec 2008)
 Ton du Chatinier (24 Dec 2008 – 19 May 2011)
 Erwin Koeman (1 July 2011 – 18 Oct 2011)
 Jan Wouters (18 Oct 2011 – 30 June 2014)
 Rob Alflen (1 July 2014 – 30 June 2015)
 Erik ten Hag (1 July 2015 – 27 Dec 2017)
 Jean-Paul de Jong (28 Dec 2017 – 4 Sep 2018)
 Dick Advocaat (17 Sep 2018 – 30 June 2019)
 John van den Brom (1 July 2019 – 6 November 2020)
 René Hake (6 November 2020 – 22 March 2022)
 Rick Kruys (caretaker) (22 March 2022 – 30 June 2022)
 Henk Fraser (1 July 2022 – 14 December 2022)
 Aleksandar Rankovic (caretaker) (15 December 2022 – 27 December 2022)
 Michael Silberbauer (28 December 2022 – present)

Kit manufacturers

See also
Dutch football league teams

References

 
Football clubs in the Netherlands
Football clubs in Utrecht (city)
Association football clubs established in 1970
1970 establishments in the Netherlands
Unrelegated association football clubs